Michael Andrew Weinberg (born February 16, 1993) is an American former child actor who is best known for his role as Kevin McCallister in Home Alone 4.

Life and career
Weinberg played Adam Kimball in Irwin Winkler's Life as a House in 2001. Filming wrapped up on his 9th birthday. He is best known for his role of  Kevin McCallister (Replacing Macaulay Culkin) in Home Alone 4 in 2002.

Filmography

Movies

Television

Personal life
Weinberg began attending the University of Michigan In the fall of 2010. He graduated with a Bachelor of Arts degree in 2015.

On April 12, 2021, Weinberg revealed he had founded an entertainment venue and event space called Nightscape which is located in The Gulch neighborhood of Nashville, Tennessee. On April 1, 2022, Nightscape opened for VIP members and press only.
 On April 7, 2022, Nightscape opened to the public.

As of January 31, 2023, Nightscape along with its official Instagram page and website have been shut down and closed for unknown reasons.

References

External links
 
 Nightscape

Actors from Los Angeles
1993 births
Living people